Greenbooth Reservoir is a reservoir to the north of Heywood and close to Norden in the Metropolitan Borough of Rochdale, within Greater Manchester, England.

In 1846, Heywood Waterworks Company finished constructing the Naden Reservoirs (Lower Naden, Middle Naden and Higher Naden) in the valley above the village of Greenbooth. By the 1950s, the village consisted of around 80 cottages, a sweet shop, a Co-op store and a school. There was also a woollen mill.

In 1958, Heywood and Middleton Water Board decided that another reservoir was needed to supply water to the growing population of Rochdale and started construction of Greenbooth Reservoir that same year. It took over two years to build, with the village abandoned, mostly demolished and then submerged. The reservoir was completed in 1961 and officially opened in August 1965.

The only visible reminder of Greenbooth village today is a plaque on the side of the reservoir dam wall which reads: "This tablet commemorates the village of Greenbooth, the site of which is submerged beneath the waters of this reservoir."

The four reservoirs are in a peaceful area for a country walk with good views of Manchester in the distance. Some of the wind turbines of Scout Moor Wind Farm are also visible from the surrounding paths.

References

Reservoirs in Greater Manchester